In enzymology, a desulfoglucosinolate sulfotransferase is an enzyme that catalyzes the chemical reaction

3'-phosphoadenylyl sulfate + desulfoglucotropeolin  adenosine 3',5'-bisphosphate + glucotropeolin

Thus, the two substrates of this enzyme are 3'-phosphoadenylyl sulfate and desulfoglucotropeolin, whereas its two products are adenosine 3',5'-bisphosphate and glucotropeolin.

This enzyme belongs to the family of transferases, specifically the sulfotransferases, which transfer sulfur-containing groups.  The systematic name of this enzyme class is 3'-phosphoadenylyl-sulfate:desulfoglucosinolate sulfotransferase. Other names in common use include PAPS-desulfoglucosinolate sulfotransferase, 3'-phosphoadenosine-5'-phosphosulfate:desulfoglucosinolate, and sulfotransferase.

References

 

EC 2.8.2
Enzymes of unknown structure